Neil Miller Carter (born 29 January 1975), is a South African-born cricketer who has played international cricket for Scotland. He previously played county cricket for Warwickshire. He went to Hottentots Holland High School and played for Boland before moving to Warwickshire. Carter completed 1,000 first class runs for Warwickshire during the match against Sussex at Edgbaston in 2005. He joined Middlesex on a loan deal in 2008, and played in the Stanford Super Series.

In 2010 he received the NatWest Professional Cricketers' Association Player of the Year Award. A pelvic injury hampered the early part of the 2011 season, but on his return to the first team, he took his best career figures of 6–30 vs Lancashire. Until mid season 2011, he had played in every 20/20 Warwickshire had played since the inception of the tournament.

He was awarded a benefit season by Warwickshire in 2012 as a reward for 10 years of service.

After the 2012 season, Carter agreed to join the Scotland cricket team. He qualified to play for Scotland due to gaining a British passport after residing in the United Kingdom while playing for Warwickshire.

References

1975 births
Living people
South African cricketers
Warwickshire cricketers
Middlesex cricketers
Cricketers from Cape Town
Matabeleland Tuskers cricketers
Boland cricketers
Cape Cobras cricketers
Scotland Twenty20 International cricketers
Scotland One Day International cricketers
Scottish cricketers
South African emigrants to the United Kingdom